The Russ Barnes Trophy is a trophy awarded by Hockey Alberta to the Alberta Junior B Provincial champion. The gold medallist advances to the Keystone Cup Western Canada Junior B championship.

Tournament organization 
Eight teams compete in the Alberta Junior B Provincials. The two largest leagues (Capital Junior Hockey League, Heritage Junior B Hockey League) send two teams each, the remaining three send one, while the host team is guaranteed a berth. 

Leagues:
 Calgary Junior Hockey League
 Capital Junior Hockey League 
 Heritage Junior B Hockey League
 North Eastern Alberta Junior B Hockey League
 Northwest Junior Hockey League

Champions 

Teams that went on to win the Keystone Cup listed in bold

Notes

References

External links 
Hockey Alberta Provincial Championships
Red Deer Vipers History (Provincial champions list)

Awards established in 1979
Ice hockey in Alberta
Ice hockey tournaments in Canada
1979 establishments in Alberta